Josef Moser (26 March 1861, in Ried im Innkreis – 3 March 1944) was an Austrian priest who gained fame as an enthusiastic entomologist. 
He studied for the priesthood in Linz, and became a priest in Zell.

1861 births
1944 deaths
Austrian entomologists
19th-century Austrian Roman Catholic priests
People from Ried im Innkreis District
20th-century Austrian Roman Catholic priests